Pontnewynydd railway station served Pontnewynydd village in the Welsh county of Monmouthshire.

History

In 1795 the Blaenavon Tramroad was opened from Pontnewynydd to Blaenavon Ironworks with branches to Abersychan, Varteg and Cwm Ffrwd to carry iron nearly 6 miles from Blaenavon Ironworks to the Monmouthshire Canal at Pontnewynydd. The line was modified to a standard gauge railway in 1854 by the Monmouthshire Railway and Canal Company.

The station (on the Newport - Blaenavon line) closed in April 1962, which was more than a year before the "Beeching Axe".  In financial terms the line was doing no worse than any of the other lines in the South Wales valleys but, like the local ironworks, the closure of the railway line was also linked to the opening of Llanwern steelworks. The amount of freight traffic the new plant generated was causing severe rail congestion in the Newport area and in an era when passenger rail transport was in decline a number of local services in Monmouthshire were withdrawn by the British Transport Commission as an operational measure.

The site today
The site is now a car park.

References

External links
Photo of station

Disused railway stations in Torfaen
Former Great Western Railway stations
Railway stations in Great Britain opened in 1854
Railway stations in Great Britain closed in 1962
1854 establishments in Wales